Wayne Drinkwalter (born April 23, 1966) is a former Canadian football defensive lineman who played nine seasons in the Canadian Football League with the Saskatchewan Roughriders, Calgary Stampeders and BC Lions. He was drafted by the Hamilton Tiger-Cats in the third round of the 1989 CFL Draft. He played amateur football for the Thunder Bay Giants of the Canadian Junior Football League. Drinkwalter was also a member of the Winnipeg Blue Bombers.

Professional career

Hamilton Tiger-Cats
Drinkwalter was drafted by the Hamilton Tiger-Cats with the nineteenth pick in the 1989 CFL Draft.

Saskatchewan Roughriders
He was traded to the Saskatchewan Roughriders in July 1989 for offensive lineman Darrel Harle. The Roughriders won the 77th Grey Cup against the Hamilton Tiger-Cats on November 26, 1989. He played for the Roughriders until 1995 and was released before the start of the 1996 CFL season.

Calgary Stampeders
Drinkwalter played for the Calgary Stampeders in 1996.

BC Lions
Drinkwalter played his final season for the BC Lions in 1997.

Winnipeg Blue Bombers
Drinkwalter was traded to the Winnipeg Blue Bombers for a fifth round draft pick but never played for the team.

References

External links
Just Sports Stats

Living people
1966 births
Players of Canadian football from Ontario
Canadian football defensive linemen
Saskatchewan Roughriders players
Calgary Stampeders players
BC Lions players
Sportspeople from Thunder Bay